This is a list of video games published or developed by WildTangent, from Dell Games.

Current

 Blackhawk Striker 2
 Blasterball 2: Holidays Blasterball 2: Remix Blasterball 2: Revolution Blasterball 3 Crystal Maze (2003)
 Fate (2005)
 Fate: Undiscovered Realms Fate: The Traitor Soul Fate: The Cursed King Final Drive: Fury Final Drive: Nitro (2004)
 John Deere Drive Green Otto's Magic Blocks Penguins! (2007)
 Phoenix Assault Polar Bowler (2004)
 Polar Golfer (2006)
 Polar Golfer: Pineapple Cup Polar Pool Polar Tubing Run 'n Gun Football Sea Life Safari (2008)
 Snowboard SuperJamFrom AWS
 Tornado JockeyFrom DreamWorks
 Shrek 2: Ogre Bowler Madagascar 4: Alex BowlerFrom Escape Factory
 Bounce Symphony Overball Word SymphonyFrom Sandlot Games
 Slyder (2002)
 Slyder Adventures Super Granny (2004)
 Super Slyder Tradewinds Cake Mania From Popcap Games 
 Plants vs. ZombiesFormer

 Battleship Game of Life Monopoly Yahtzee Betty Bad Blasterball Wild Cannonballs! Dark Orbit Fill Up Five Card Frenzy Glow Glow Firefly Excavation Groove-o-Matic Invasion Jewel Thief LEGO Builder Bots Lexibox Deluxe Monster Park Madness Orbital Run 'N Gun Football SabreWing 2 Shooting Stars Pool Snowboard Extreme STX''

References

External links 
 WildTangent Games

WildTangent